Acianthera viridis is a species of orchid plant native to Ecuador.

References 

viridis
Flora of Ecuador